Bālādeh and Bālā Deh  is a city and capital of Jereh and Baladeh District, in Fars Province, Iran.  At the 2016 census, its population was 5,972, in 856 families.

References

Populated places in Kazerun County

Cities in Fars Province